Hirobe (written:  or ) is a Japanese surname. Notable people with the surname include:

, Japanese sailor
, Japanese badminton player

Japanese-language surnames